CEAN is an acronym for the Comprehensive Erlang Archive Network.
It follows the tradition of the Comprehensive TeX Archive Network (CTAN), Comprehensive Perl Archive Network (CPAN) and the Comprehensive R Archive Network (CRAN).

External links
Comprehensive Erlang Archive Network

Archive networks
Erlang (programming language)